The Polish II Corps, 1943–1947, was a major tactical and operational unit of the Polish Armed Forces in the West during World War II. It was commanded by Lieutenant General Władysław Anders and fought with distinction in the Italian Campaign, in particular at the Battle of Monte Cassino. By the end of 1945, the corps had grown to well over 100,000 soldiers.

History
Victims of Soviet deportations from occupied Poland in 1939–40 had been processed by the NKVD and sent to prison or exile in Siberia. The Nazi-Soviet pact of August 1939 effectively ended on 22 June 1941 when the German Wehrmacht invaded the USSR. The release of many thousands of former citizens of Poland (including Ukrainians and Belorussians) from the Soviet Gulags, following the signing of the Polish-Russian Military Agreement on 14 August 1941, allowed for the creation of a Polish Army on Soviet soil. Its first commander, General Michał Tokarzewski, began the task of forming this army in the Soviet town of Totskoye on 17 August. The commander ultimately chosen by Władysław Sikorski to lead the new army, Lieutenant General Władysław Anders, had just been released from the Lubyanka prison in Moscow, on 4 August, and did not issue his first orders or announce his appointment as commander until 22 August.

This army grew over the following two years and provided the bulk of the units and troops of the Polish II Corps.

The Polish II Corps was created in 1943 from various units fighting alongside the Allies in all theatres of war. The 3rd Carpathian Rifle Division was formed in the Middle East from smaller Polish units fighting in Egypt and Tobruk, as well as the Polish Army in the East that was evacuated from the Soviet Union through the Persian Corridor. Its creation was based on the British Allied Forces Act 1940, which allowed the Allied units of the exiled government of Poland to be grouped in one theatre of war. However, the British High Command never agreed to incorporate the exiled Polish Air Force into the Corps.

In February 1944, the Polish II Corps was transferred from Egypt to Italy, where it became an independent part of the British Eighth Army, under Lieutenant-General Sir Oliver Leese. During 1944–45, the Corps fought with distinction in the Italian campaign, during the fourth and final Battle of Monte Cassino in May 1944, the Battle of Ancona during Operation Olive (the fighting on the Gothic Line in September 1944), and the Battle of Bologna during the final offensive in Italy in March 1945.

In 1944, the Polish II Corps numbered about 50,000 soldiers. During three subsequent battles, it suffered heavy losses (in the final stage of the Battle of Monte Cassino, even the support units were mobilised and used in combat) and it was suggested to General Anders that he withdraw his units. However, since the Soviet Union broke off diplomatic relations with the Polish government and no Poles were allowed out of the USSR, Anders believed that the only source of recruits lay ahead – in German POW camps and concentration camps.

By 1945, new units were added, composed mainly of freed POWs and Poles forcibly conscripted into the Wehrmacht. This increased the Corps' strength to around 75,000 men, approximately 20,000 of whom were transferred to other Polish units fighting in the West. After the war, the divisions of the Corps were used in Italy until 1946, when they were transported to Britain and demobilised. The total establishment of the Polish II Corps in 1946 was 103,000.

The majority of soldiers remained in exile and settled in Britain, although some elected to settle in other countries such as Canada or Australia, either obtaining immigration visas there or relying on previous ties for repatriation.

The Corps had a consistently high fighting reputation and was well-regarded by the American and Commonwealth troops with whom they fought.

Those that settled in Britain were transported from many ports, including Toulon, France.

Composition
In May 1945, the Corps consisted of 55,780 men and approximately 1,500 women in auxiliary services. There was also a bear mascot, named Wojtek, who was officially entered onto the unit roll as a private soldier, subsequently being promoted to corporal. The majority of the Corps were Polish citizens who had been deported by the NKVD to the Soviet Gulags during the Soviet Union's annexation of Eastern Poland (Kresy Wschodnie) in 1939. Following Operation Barbarossa and the Sikorski-Mayski Agreement, many of them were released and allowed to join the Polish Armed Forces in the East being formed in Southern Russia and Kazakhstan. For political reasons, the Soviet Union soon withdrew support for the creation of a Polish Army on its territory and reduced the supply rate, which resulted in General Władysław Anders withdrawing his troops to British-held Persia and Iraq. From there, they were moved to British-controlled Palestine, where they joined forces with the 3rd Carpathian Division, which was composed mainly of Polish soldiers who had managed to escape to French Lebanon through Romania and Hungary after the defeat of Poland in 1939.

The main bulk of the soldiers were from the eastern voivodeships of pre-war Poland. Although the majority were ethnic Poles, there were also other nationalities, including Jews, Belarusians and Ukrainians. After being relocated to Palestine, many Jewish soldiers deserted and fled into the countryside. However, Menachem Begin - the future Prime Minister of Israel and at the time a II Corps soldier - though urged by his friends to desert, refused to remove his uniform until he had been officially discharged.

The armament was as follows:
 248 pieces of artillery
 288 anti-tank guns
 234 anti-aircraft guns
 264 tanks
 1,241 APCs
 440 armoured cars
 12,064 cars, Bren carriers and trucks
 1 Syrian brown bear Wojtek (soldier bear)

Losses
During the Italian Campaign, the Polish II Corps lost 11,379 men. Among them were 2,301 killed in action, 8,543 wounded in action and 535 missing in action.

Of the 2,301 killed, 1,079 died during the Battle of Monte Cassino and are interred at the Monte Cassino Polish war cemetery, several hundred meters from the rebuilt abbey.

Order of battle

Corps Organisation April 1944
HQ 2 Polish Corps
2 Armoured Brigade
AGPA - Army Group of Polish Artillery
3 Carpathian Division
12 Podolski Recce Regt. (Dismounted)
1 Carpathian Rifle Brigade 
1,2,3 Battalions
2 Squadron 
7 Armoured Regiment
2 Carpathian Rifles Brigade 
4,5,6 Battalions
5 Kresowa Division
5 Wilenska Infantry Brigade 
13,14,15 and 18 Battalions
3 Squadron 
4 Armoured Regiment
HQ6
Lwowska Infantry Brigade
15 Poznaski Recce Regiment (Dismounted)
Carpathian Lancers Regiment (Dismounted)
Division Reserve
16, 17 Battalion

1946
At the time of its demobilisation in 1946, the 2nd Polish Corps establishment was as follows: (Note that there were some differences between this order of battle and the one at the time of the battle for Monte Cassino in 1944.)

Polish 3rd Carpathian Infantry Division CO: Maj. Gen. Bronisław Duch
1st Carpathian Rifle Brigade
1st Carpathian Rifle Battalion
2nd Carpathian Rifle Battalion
3rd Carpathian Rifle Battalion
2nd Carpathian Rifle Brigade
4th Carpathian Rifle Battalion
5th Carpathian Rifle Battalion
6th Carpathian Rifle Battalion
3rd Carpathian Rifle Brigade
7th Carpathian Rifle Battalion
8th Carpathian Rifle Battalion
9th "Boloński" Carpathian Rifle Battalion (Named for liberating Bologna)
Other Divisional Units
7th Lubelski Uhlan Regiment (Divisional Reconnaissance)
1st Carpathian Light Artillery Regiment
2nd Carpathian Light Artillery Regiment
3rd Carpathian Light Artillery Regiment
3rd Carpathian Anti-tank Regiment
3rd Light Anti-aircraft Regiment
3rd Heavy Machine Gun Battalion
3rd Carpathian Sapper (Engineer) Battalion
1st Carpathian Field Engineer Company
2nd Carpathian Field Engineer Company
3rd Carpathian Field Engineer Company
3rd Carpathian Field Park Company
3rd Carpathian Signals Battalion

5th Kresowa Infantry Division CO: Brig. Gen. Nikodem Sulik
4th Wolyńska Infantry Brigade
10th Wolyńska Rifle Battalion
11th Wolyńska Rifle Battalion
12th Wolyńska Rifle Battalion
5th Wilno Infantry Brigade
13th Wilenski Rifle Battalion "Rysiow"
14th Wilenski Rifle Battalion "Zbikow"
15th Wilenski Rifle Battalion "Wilkow"
6th Lwów Infantry Brigade
16th Lwowski Rifle Battalion
17th Lwowski Rifle Battalion
18th Lwowski Rifle Battalion
Other divisional unit
25th Wielkopolski Uhlan Regiment
4th Kresowy Light Artillery Regiment
5th Wileński Light Artillery Regiment
6th Lwowski Light Artillery Regiment
5th Kresowy Anti-tank Regiment
5th Kresowy Light Anti-aircraft Regiment
5th Kresowy Heavy Machine Gun Battalion
5th Kresowa Sapper (Engineer) Battalion
4th Kresowa Field Engineer Company
5th Kresowa Field Engineer Company
6th Kresowa Field Engineer Company
5th Kresowa Field Park Company
5th Kresowy Signals Battalion
5th Military Police (Provost) Squadron

2nd Warsaw Armoured Division. CO: Brig.Gen. Bronisław Rakowski
Carpathian Uhlan/Lancer Regiment (Divisional Reconnaissance)
2nd Warsaw Armoured Brigade
4th ‘Skorpion’ Armoured Regiment
1st Krechowiecki Uhlan Regiment
6th ‘Children of Lwów’ Armoured Regiment
2nd Motorised Independent Polish Commando Company
16th Pomorska Infantry Brigade
64th Pomorski Infantry Battalion
66th Pomorski Infantry Battalion
68th Pomorski Infantry Battalion
16th Pomorski Support Company
Other divisional units
HQ Division Artillery
7th Horse Artillery Regiment
16th Pomorski Light Artillery Regiment
2nd Anti-tank Regiment
2nd Light Anti-aircraft Regiment
2nd Warszawski Signals Battalion
2nd Warszawski Engineer Battalion
9th Forward Tank Replacement Squadron
9th Supply Company
19th Supply Company
28th Supply Company
9th Workshop Company
16th Workshop Company
2nd Armoured Division Military Police (Provost) Company
9th Field Court
343 Anti-malaria Section

14th WIELKOPOLSKA Armoured Brigade
15th Poznań Uhlans Regiment (Previously part of 5th Kresowa Division)
3rd Śląsk Uhlan Regiment
10th Hussar Regiment
14th Forward Tank Replacement Squadron
14th Wielkopolska Engineer Company
14th Wielkopolska Signals Squadron
14th Workshop Company
14th Supply Company
14th Military Police (Provost) Squadron
16th Field Court

 Headquarters 2nd Corps
12th Podolski Uhlan Regiment (Headquarters Recce) (Previously part of 3rd Carpathian Rifle Division)
7th Armoured Regiment
7th Anti-tank Regiment
7th Light Anti-aircraft Regiment
8th Medium Anti-aircraft Regiment
10th Hussar Regiment
1st Artillery Survey Regiment
663 Polish Air Observation Post Squadron
2nd Corp General Staff Defence Company
2nd Corps Artillery Group CO: Brig. Gen. LUDWIG ZABKOWSKI
9th Heavy Artillery Regiment
10th Medium Artillery Regiment Unit Code 3501
11th Medium Artillery Regiment
12th Medium Artillery Regiment
13th Medium Artillery Regiment
Other HQ Units
10th Engineer Battalion
1st Railway Engineer Battalion
10th Bridge Engineer Company
10th Bomb Disposal Platoon
301 Engineer Company
306 Engineer Material Park Platoon
11th Signals Battalion
11th Radio Platoon
12th Information Platoon
385 Signals Company
386 Signals Platoon
387 Signals Platoon
389 Radio Platoon
104 Cipher Section
390 Signals Company
392 Radio Platoon
Air Traffic Control Platoon
21st Transport Company
22nd Transport Company (Artillery Supply Company) 
61 Artillery Supply Platoon
62 Artillery Supply Platoon
63 Artillery Supply Platoon
64 Artillery Supply Platoon
65 Artillery Supply Platoon
23rd Transport Company
29th Ambulance Company
2nd Traffic Control Squadron
11th Military Police (Provost) Squadron
12th Military Police (Provost) Squadron
460 Military Police (Provost) Squadron
Investigation Platoon
Dog Handling Platoon
12th Field Court
13th Workshop Company
30th Independent Workshop Platoon
35th Workshop Company
12th Geographic Company
312 Map Store
316 Transport Company: Women's Auxiliary Service (Poland)
317 Transport Company: Women's Auxiliary Service (Poland)
318 Mobile Canteen/Mobile Library Company: Women's Auxiliary Service (Poland)
325 Supply Depot
326 Supply Depot
327 Supply Depot 
328 Supply Depot
331 Field Bakery
332 Field Bakery
333 Field Butchery
334 Fuel Depot
335 Fire Fighting Team
336 Stationery Supplies Depot
31st Sanitary (Medical) Company
32nd Field Hygiene Platoon
34th Anti-malaria Section
Field Chemical-Bacteriological Section
344 Medical Supplies Depot
345 Field Surgery Team
346 Field Surgery Team
347 Field Surgery Team
348 Field Surgery Team
349 Field Blood Transfusion Team
350 Field Surgery Team
351 Field Surgery Team
352 Field Blood Transfusion Team
370 Material Salvage Depot
371 Material Salvage Depot
372 Material Salvage Depot
375 Field Bath
375 Field Bath and Laundry
40 Material Park: Transport Section
413 Forward Ammunition Depot
104 Central Field Post Office
117 Field Post Office
127 Field Post Office
55 Mobile Stores Repair Platoon
2nd Corps Base CO:Gen Przewlocki
Guard Battalion A
Guard Battalion B
Guard Battalion C
Guard Battalion D
1st Military Hospital
3rd Military Hospital
3rd Field Hospital (Former 3rd Casualty Clearing Station)
5th Field Hospital (Former 5th Casualty Clearing Station)
14th Field Court
Officer Topographic School
Officer Cadet Reserve Artillery School
Officer Cadet Supply & Transport School
Armoured Forces Training Centre CO LtCol Stanislaw Szostak
General W. Anders Officer Cadet Armoured Cavalry School
7th Infantry Division Reserve Unit
17th Infantry Brigade
21st Infantry Battalion
22nd Infantry Battalion
7th Armoured Regiment
17th Artillery Regiment
17th Machine Gun Company
17th Engineer Company
17th Signals Company
17th Workshop Company
17th Engineer Company
17th Military Police (Provost) Squadron

Battles / Operations

In Italy
1: Defensive Operations on the Sangro Line (31 January - 15 April 1944) (Winter Line / Gustav Line)

2: The Battle of Monte Cassino (Operation Diadem)
 Fourth Battle of Monte Cassino (24 April - 17 May 1944)
 Capture of Piedmonte (20–25 May 1944)
 
3: Operations in Emilian Apennines - (Operation Olive/ Gothic Line)
 First Battle of Ancona (30 June - 9 July 1944)
 Second Battle of Ancona (17–19 July 1944)
 The Battle of Cesena-Forli (14 August 1944)
 The Battle of Forli (14 November 1944, 24 November 1944)
 The Three Battles of Faenza (14 November - 17 December 1944)

4: Defence of Senio River (2 January - 5 April 1945)
 
5: Lombardy Campaign - Spring 1945 offensive in Italy / Operation Grapeshot - Operation Buckland
 Battles between Senio and Santerno Rivers (9 - 12 April 1945)
 Battle of Argenta Gap / Battle for the Gaiana River (16 - 21 April 1945)
 Capture/Battle of Bologna (21 April 1945)
 Last Operations of the Polish Corps - Defeat of German Armies South of the River Po (21 April - 2 May 1945).

See also
 Anders Army
 Polish contribution to World War II
 Polish government in exile
 Polish I Corps
 Polish First Army
 Władysław Grydziuszko
 Western betrayal
 Polish British
 Polish Resettlement Corps

Notes

References

 
 
 
 

 
 
 
 
 
 
 
  (Article by former pilot of 663 DSA on the 50th anniversary of the unit and continue the tradition of the British 663 Squadron)

External links
 An Illustrated History of the Polish II Corps. Mieczyslaw Kuczynski. - http://waldemar.x10host.com/dzieje/
 The Polish II Corps at Monte Cassino
 https://www.polishexilesofww2.org/
 https://warfarehistorynetwork.com/2018/12/10/the-polish-ii-corps-in-italy/
 https://warfarehistorynetwork.com/2016/09/12/surging-toward-the-alps-last-battles-of-the-italian-campaign/
 https://www.polishgreatness.com/creationofsecondpolishcorp.html
 Museum of the Polish Second Corps - https://2korpus.pl/en/monte-cassino-ancona-bologna/
 New Zealands Italian Campaign - http://nzetc.victoria.ac.nz/tm/scholarly/tei-WH2-2Ita.html
 Museum of the 2nd Polish Corps in Józefów - https://2korpus.pl/monte-cassino-ankona-bolonia/

Operation Buckland
http://www.historyofwar.org/articles/operation_buckland_argenta.html
https://codenames.info/operation/buckland/

Operation Grapeshot
http://www.historyofwar.org/articles/operation_grapeshot_spring_offensive.html 
https://codenames.info/operation/grapeshot/

2
Military units and formations established in 1943
Military units and formations disestablished in 1947